The 2021 NHL Entry Draft was the 59th NHL Entry Draft. The draft was held on July 23–24, 2021, delayed by one month from its normally scheduled time of June due to the COVID-19 pandemic and the later-than-normal finish of the 2020–21 NHL season. It was thus the first draft held in July since 2005. For the second year in a row, the event was held in a remote format, with teams convening via videoconferencing, and Commissioner Gary Bettman announcing the selections in the opening round and deputy commissioner Bill Daly in all subsequent rounds from the NHL Network studios in Secaucus, New Jersey.

The first three selections were Owen Power going to the Buffalo Sabres, Matty Beniers being selected by the Seattle Kraken, and Mason McTavish being picked by the Anaheim Ducks.

Eligibility
Ice hockey players born between January 1, 2001, and September 15, 2003, were eligible for selection in the 2021 NHL Entry Draft. Additionally, un-drafted, non-North American players born in 2000 were eligible for the draft; and those players who were drafted in the 2019 NHL Entry Draft, but not signed by an NHL team and who were born after June 30, 2001, were also eligible to re-enter the draft.

Draft lottery
From the 2012–13 NHL season up to the 2020–21 NHL season all teams not qualifying for the Stanley Cup playoffs have had a "weighted" chance at winning the first overall selection. Beginning with the 2014–15 NHL season, the league changed the weighting system that was used in previous years. Under the new system, the odds of winning the draft lottery for the four lowest finishing teams in the league decreased, while the odds for the other non-playoff teams increased. The draft lottery took place on June 2, 2021. After changing the number of lottery drawings earlier in the season, the first two picks overall in this draft were awarded by lottery. The Buffalo Sabres and Seattle Kraken won the two draft lotteries that took place on June 2, 2021, giving them the first and second picks overall. Buffalo retained the first pick, while Seattle moved up one spot and Anaheim dropped one spot to third overall.

The expansion Seattle Kraken had the same odds of winning the lottery as the team that finished with the third fewest points (this ended up being the New Jersey Devils). Because the Arizona Coyotes' 2021 first-round pick was forfeited as the result of a penalty sanction due to violations of the NHL Combine Testing Policy during the 2019–20 NHL season, Arizona's lottery odds were instead listed as re-draws.

{| class="wikitable"
|+ Complete draft position odds
! Team
! 1st
! 2nd
! 3rd
! 4th
! 5th
! 6th
! 7th
! 8th
! 9th
! 10th
! 11th
! 12th
! 13th
! 14th
! 15th
! 16th
|-
! Buffalo
| style="background:#A9D0F5;"| 16.6% || 15.0% || 68.4% || || || || || || || || || || || || ||
|-
! Anaheim
| 12.1% || 11.7% || style="background:#DDDDDD;"| 26.9% || 49.3% || || || || || || || || || || || ||
|-
! Seattle
| 10.3% || style="background:#F5A9BC;"| 10.2% || 4.7% || 39.3% || 35.6% || || || || || || || || || || ||
|-
! New Jersey
| 10.3% || 10.2% || || style="background:#DDDDDD;"| 11.5% || 43.9% || 24.2% || || || || || || || || || ||
|-
! Columbus
| 8.5% || 8.6% || || || style="background:#DDDDDD;"| 20.6% || 45.8% || 16.5% || || || || || || || || ||
|-
! Detroit
| 7.6% || 7.8% || || || || style="background:#DDDDDD;"| 30.0% || 43.8% || 10.9% || || || || || || || ||
|-
! San Jose
| 6.7% || 6.9% || || || || || style="background:#DDDDDD;"| 39.7% || 39.7% || 6.9% || || || || || || ||
|-
! Los Angeles
| 5.8% || 6.0% || || || || || || style="background:#DDDDDD;"| 49.4% || 34.5% || 4.3% || || || || || ||
|-
! Vancouver
| 5.4% || 5.7% || || || || || || || style="background:#DDDDDD;"| 58.6% || 28.0% || 2.4% || || || || ||
|-
! Ottawa
| 4.5% || 4.8% || || || || || || || || style="background:#DDDDDD;"| 67.7% || 21.8% || 1.2% || || || ||
|-
! Arizona
| 3.1% || 3.3% || || || || || || || || || style="background:#DDDDDD;"| 75.9% || 17.1% || 0.7% || || ||
|-
! Chicago
| 2.7% || 2.9% || || || || || || || || || || style="background:#DDDDDD;"| 81.7% || 12.4% || 0.3% || ||
|-
! Calgary
| 2.2% || 2.4% || || || || || || || || || || || style="background:#DDDDDD;"| 87.0% || 8.4% || 0.1% ||
|-
! Philadelphia
| 1.8% || 2.0% || || || || || || || || || || || || style="background:#DDDDDD;"| 91.3% || 4.9% || >0.0%
|-
! Dallas
| 1.4% || 1.5% || || || || || || || || || || || || || style="background:#DDDDDD;"| 95.0% || 2.1%
|-
! NY Rangers
| 1.0% || 1.1% || || || || || || || || || || || || || || style="background:#DDDDDD;"| 97.9%
|}

Top prospects
Source: NHL Central Scouting (May 27, 2021) ranking.

Selections by round
The order of the 2021 Entry Draft is listed below.

Round one

Notes
 The Vancouver Canucks' first-round pick went to the Arizona Coyotes as the result of a trade on July 23, 2021, that sent Oliver Ekman-Larsson and Conor Garland to Vancouver in exchange for Jay Beagle, Loui Eriksson, Antoine Roussel, a second-round pick in 2022, a seventh-round pick in 2023 and this pick.
 The Arizona Coyotes' first-round pick was forfeited as the result of a penalty sanction due to violations of the NHL Combine Testing Policy during the 2019–20 NHL season. The penalty includes the forfeiture of a second-round pick in 2020 and this pick.
 The Chicago Blackhawks' first-round pick went to the Columbus Blue Jackets as the result of a trade on July 23, 2021, that sent Seth Jones, Tampa Bay's first-round-pick in 2021 (32nd overall) and a sixth-round pick in 2022 to Chicago in exchange for Adam Boqvist, a second-round pick in 2021 (44th overall), a conditional first-round pick in 2022 and this pick.
 The Philadelphia Flyers' first-round pick went to the Buffalo Sabres as the result of a trade on July 23, 2021, that sent Rasmus Ristolainen to Philadelphia in exchange for Robert Hagg, a second-round pick in 2023 and this pick.
 The Dallas Stars first-round pick went to the Detroit Red Wings as the result of a trade on July 23, 2021, that sent Washington's first-round pick, the Rangers' second-round pick and Ottawa's fifth-round pick all in 2021 (23rd, 48th and 138th overall) to Dallas in exchange for this pick.
 The Edmonton Oilers' first-round pick went to the Minnesota Wild as the result of a trade on July 23, 2021, that sent a first-round pick and Pittsburgh's third-round pick both in 2021 (22nd and 90th overall) to Edmonton in exchange for this pick.
 The Minnesota Wild's first-round pick went to the Edmonton Oilers as the result of a trade on July 23, 2021, that sent a first-round pick in 2021 (20th overall) to Minnesota in exchange for Pittsburgh's third-round pick both in 2021 (90th overall) and this pick.
 The Washington Capitals' first-round pick went to the Dallas Stars as the result of a trade on July 23, 2021, that sent a first-round pick in 2021 (15th overall) to Detroit in exchange for the Rangers' second-round pick and Ottawa's sixth round pick both in 2021 (48th and 138th overall) and this pick.
Detroit previously acquired this pick as the result of a trade on April 12, 2021, that sent Anthony Mantha to Washington in exchange for Richard Panik, Jakub Vrana, a second-round pick in 2022 and this pick.
 The Toronto Maple Leafs' first-round pick went to the Columbus Blue Jackets as the result of a trade on April 11, 2021, that sent Nick Foligno and Stefan Noesen to Toronto in exchange for a fourth-round pick in 2022  and this pick.
 The Pittsburgh Penguins' first-round pick went to the Minnesota Wild as the result of a trade on February 10, 2020, that sent Jason Zucker to Pittsburgh in exchange for Alex Galchenyuk, Calen Addison and this pick (being conditional at the time of the trade). The condition – Minnesota will receive a 2021 first-round pick at Pittsburgh's choice if the Penguins fail to qualify for the 2020 Eastern Conference First Round – was converted on August 12, 2020, when the Penguins elected to defer the pick to 2021.
 The Carolina Hurricanes' first-round pick went to the Nashville Predators as the result of a trade on July 23, 2021, that sent Los Angeles and Nashville's second-round picks both in 2021 to Carolina in exchange for this pick.
 The New York Islanders' first-round pick went to the New Jersey Devils as the result of a trade on April 7, 2021, that sent Kyle Palmieri and Travis Zajac to New York in exchange for A. J. Greer, Mason Jobst, a conditional fourth-round pick in 2022 and this pick.
 The Tampa Bay Lightning's first-round pick went to the Chicago Blackhawks as the result of a trade on July 23, 2021, that sent a first and second-round pick both in 2021 (12th and 44th overall) to Columbus in exchange for Seth Jones, a sixth-round pick in 2022 and this pick.
Columbus previously acquired this pick as the result of a trade on April 10, 2021, that sent Brian Lashoff to Tampa Bay in exchange for a third-round pick in 2022 and this pick.

Round two

Notes
 The New Jersey Devils' second-round pick went to the Detroit Red Wings as the result of a trade on July 24, 2021, that sent a second-round pick and Tampa Bay's fourth-round pick both in 2021 (38th and 128th overall) to Vegas in exchange for this pick.
Vegas previously acquired this pick as the result of a trade on July 29, 2019, that sent Nikita Gusev to New Jersey in exchange for a third-round pick in 2020 and this pick.
 The Columbus Blue Jackets' second-round pick went to the Arizona Coyotes as the result of a trade on December 26, 2020, that sent Derek Stepan to Ottawa in exchange for this pick.
Ottawa previously acquired this pick as the result of a trade on February 23, 2019, that sent Ryan Dzingel and Calgary's seventh-round pick in 2019 to Columbus in exchange for Anthony Duclair, a second-round pick in 2020, and this pick.
 The Detroit Red Wings' second-round pick went to the Vegas Golden Knights as the result of a trade on July 24, 2021, that sent New Jersey's second-round pick in 2021 (36th overall) to Detroit in exchange for Tampa Bay's fourth-round pick in 2021 (128th overall) and this pick.
 The San Jose Sharks' second-round pick went to the Ottawa Senators as the result of a trade on September 13, 2018, that sent Erik Karlsson and Francis Perron to San Jose in exchange for Chris Tierney, Dylan DeMelo, Josh Norris, Rudolfs Balcers, a conditional second-round pick in 2019, a conditional l first-round pick in 2019 or 2020, a conditional first-round pick no later than 2022, and this pick (being conditional at the time of the trade). The condition – Ottawa will receive a second-round pick in 2021 if Karlsson re-signs with the Sharks for the 2019–20 NHL season and the Sharks do not make the 2019 Stanley Cup Finals – was converted on June 17, 2019, when Karlsson re-signed with San Jose for the 2019–20 NHL season.
 The Los Angeles Kings' second-round pick went to the Carolina Hurricanes as the result of a trade on July 23, 2021, that sent Carolina's first-round pick (27th overall) in 2021 to Nashville in exchange for a second-round pick (51st overall) and this pick.
Nashville previously acquired this pick as the result of a trade on July 1, 2021, that sent Viktor Arvidsson to Los Angeles in exchange for a third-round pick in 2022 and this pick.
 The Ottawa Senators' second-round pick went to the Los Angeles Kings as the result of a trade on July 24, 2021, that sent St. Louis' second-round pick and a fifth-round pick both in 2021 (49th and 136th overall) to Ottawa in exchange for this pick.
 The Chicago Blackhawks' second-round pick went to the Carolina Hurricanes as the result of a trade on July 23, 2021, that sent Jake Bean to Columbus in exchange for this pick.
Columbus previously acquired this pick as the result of a trade on July 23, 2021, that sent Seth Jones, Tampa Bay's first-round-pick in 2021 (32nd overall) and a sixth-round pick in 2022 to Chicago in exchange for Adam Boqvist, a first-round pick in 2021 (12th overall), a conditional first-round pick in 2022 and this pick.
 The New York Rangers' second-round pick went to the Dallas Stars as the result of a trade on July 23, 2021, that sent a first-round pick in 2021 (15th overall) to Detroit in exchange for Washington's first-round pick and Ottawa's fifth-round pick both in 2021 (23rd and 138th overall) and this pick.
Detroit previously acquired this pick as the result of a trade on September 26, 2020, that sent future considerations to New York in exchange for Marc Staal and this pick.
 The St. Louis Blues' second-round pick went to the Ottawa Senators as the result of a trade on July 24, 2021, that sent a second-round pick in 2021 (42nd overall) to Los Angeles in exchange for a fifth-round pick in 2021 (136th overall) and this pick.
Los Angeles previously acquired this as the result of a trade on February 19, 2020, that sent Alec Martinez to Vegas in exchange for a second-round pick in 2020 and this pick.
Vegas previously acquired this pick as the result of a trade on June 28, 2019, that sent Colin Miller to Buffalo in exchange for a fifth-round pick in 2022 and this pick.
Buffalo previously acquired this pick as the result of a trade on July 1, 2018, that sent Ryan O'Reilly to St. Louis in exchange for Vladimir Sobotka, Patrik Berglund, Tage Thompson, a conditional first-round pick in 2019 or 2020 and this pick.
 The Nashville Predators' second-round pick went to the Carolina Hurricanes as the result of a trade on July 23, 2021, that sent Carolina's first-round pick (27th overall) in 2021 to Nashville in exchange for Los Angeles' second-round pick (40th overall) and this pick.
 The Edmonton Oilers' second-round pick went to the New York Islanders as the result of a trade on July 16, 2021, that sent Nick Leddy to Detroit in exchange for Richard Panik and this pick.
Detroit previously acquired this pick as the result of a trade on February 24, 2020, that sent Andreas Athanasiou and Ryan Kuffner to Edmonton in exchange for Sam Gagner, a second-round pick in 2020 and this pick.
 The Boston Bruins' second-round pick went to the Buffalo Sabres as the result of a trade on April 12, 2021, that sent Taylor Hall and Curtis Lazar to Boston in exchange for Anders Bjork and this pick.
 The Carolina Hurricanes' second-round pick went to the Los Angeles Kings as the result of a trade on July 24, 2021, that sent a third-round pick and Calgary's fourth-round pick both in 2021 (72nd and 109th overall) to Carolina in exchange for this pick.
 The Colorado Avalanche's second-round pick went to the Arizona Coyotes as the result of a trade on July 17, 2021, that sent future considerations to the New York Islanders in exchange for Andrew Ladd, a conditional second-round pick in 2022, a conditional third-round pick in 2023, and this pick.
The Islanders previously acquired this pick as the result of a trade on October 12, 2020, that sent Devon Toews to Colorado in exchange for a second-round pick in 2022 and this pick.
 The New York Islanders' second-round pick went to the Colorado Avalanche as the result of a trade on July 15, 2021, that sent Ryan Graves to New Jersey in exchange for Mikhail Maltsev and this pick.
New Jersey previously acquired this pick as the result of a trade on February 16, 2020, that sent Andy Greene to New York in exchange for David Quenneville and this pick.
 The Vegas Golden Knights' second-round pick went to the Chicago Blackhawks as the result of a trade on April 12, 2021, that sent Nick DeSimone and a fifth-round pick in 2022 to Vegas in exchange for a third-round pick in 2022 and this pick.
 The Tampa Bay Lightning's second-round pick went to the Montreal Canadiens as the result of a trade on October 7, 2020, that sent St. Louis' second-round pick in 2020 (57th overall) to Tampa Bay in exchange for a fourth-round pick in 2020 (124th overall) and this pick.

Round three

Notes
 The Buffalo Sabres' third-round pick went to the New York Rangers as the result of a trade on July 1, 2019, that sent Jimmy Vesey to Buffalo in exchange for this pick.
 The San Jose Sharks' third-round pick went to the St. Louis Blues as the result of a trade on July 24, 2021, that sent a third and sixth-round pick both in 2021 (81st and 177th overall) to San Jose in exchange for this pick.
 The Los Angeles Kings' third-round pick went to the Nashville Predators as the result of a trade on July 24, 2021, that sent a third and fifth-round pick both in 2021 (83rd and 147th overall) to Carolina in exchange for this pick.
Carolina previously acquired this pick as the result of a trade on July 24, 2021, that sent a second-round pick in 2021 (59th overall) to Los Angeles in exchange for Calgary's fourth-round pick in 2021 (109th overall) and this pick.
 The Vancouver Canucks' third-round pick went to the Dallas Stars as the result of a trade on July 17, 2021, that sent Jason Dickinson to Vancouver in exchange for this pick.
 The Arizona Coyotes' third-round pick went to the New York Rangers as the result of a trade on July 24, 2021, that sent a third and sixth-round pick both in 2021 (80th and 176th overall) to Washington in exchange for this pick.
Washington previously acquired this pick as the result of a trade on April 11, 2021, that sent a Jonas Siegenthaler to New Jersey in exchange for this conditional pick. The condition – Washington will receive Arizona's third-round pick in 2021 at New Jersey's choice, if the pick is available before the time of the selection – the date of conversion is unknown.
New Jersey previously acquired this pick as the result of a trade on December 16, 2019, that sent Taylor Hall and Blake Speers to Arizona in exchange for Nick Merkley, Kevin Bahl, Nate Schnarr, a conditional first-round pick in 2020 and this pick (being conditional at the time of the trade). The condition – New Jersey will receive a third-round pick in 2021 if Arizona does not advance to the 2020 Western Conference Second Round and Hall does not re-sign with Arizona for the 2020–21 NHL season – was converted when Arizona was eliminated in the First Round of the playoffs on August 19, 2020, and when Hall signed with the Buffalo Sabres on October 11, 2020.
 The Chicago Blackhawks' third-round pick went to the Anaheim Ducks as the result of a trade on July 24, 2021, that sent a third-round pick in 2022 to Montreal in exchange for this pick.
Montreal previously acquired this pick as the result of a trade on June 30, 2019, that sent Andrew Shaw and a seventh-round pick in 2021 to Chicago in exchange for second and seventh-round picks both in 2020 and this pick.
 The New York Rangers' third-round pick went to the Washington Capitals as the result of a trade on July 24, 2021, that sent Arizona's third-round pick in 2021 (75th overall) to New York in exchange for a sixth-round pick in 2021 (176th overall) and this pick.
 The St. Louis Blues' third-round pick went to the San Jose Sharks as the result of a trade on July 24, 2021, that sent a third-round pick in 2021 (71st overall) to St. Louis in exchange for a sixth-round pick in 2021 (177th overall) and this pick.
 The Nashville Predators' third-round pick went to the Carolina Hurricanes as the result of a trade on July 24, 2021, that sent Los Angeles' third-round pick in 2021 (72nd overall) to Nashville in exchange for a fifth-round pick in 2021 (147th overall) and this pick.
 The Edmonton Oilers' third-round pick went to the Los Angeles Kings as the result of a trade on July 24, 2021, that sent Toronto's third-round pick and a sixth-round pick both in 2021 (89th and 168th overall) to Calgary in exchange for this pick.
Calgary previously acquired this pick as the result of a trade on July 19, 2019, that sent James Neal to Edmonton in exchange for Milan Lucic and this pick (being conditional at the time of the trade). The condition – Calgary will receive a third-round pick in 2020 or 2021 at Edmonton's choice, after the league made a ruling on this conditional pick on July 31, 2020. The original condition on this pick was that Calgary will receive a 2020 third-round pick if Neal scores at least 21 goals during the 2019–20 NHL season and Lucic has at least ten fewer goals than Neal – was converted when the Oilers elected to keep their 2020 third-round pick on October 7, 2020.
 The Washington Capitals' third-round pick went to the Montreal Canadiens as the result of a trade on October 7, 2020, that sent Anaheim's fourth-round pick in 2020 (98th overall) to San Jose in exchange for this pick.
San Jose previously acquired this pick as the result of a trade on February 18, 2020, that sent Brenden Dillon to Washington in exchange for Colorado's second-round pick in 2020 and this pick (being conditional at the time of the trade). The condition – San Jose will receive a third-round pick in 2021 if Washington does not win the Stanley Cup in 2020 – was converted when Washington was eliminated from the 2020 Stanley Cup playoffs on August 20, 2020.
 The Florida Panthers' third-round pick went to the Buffalo Sabres as the result of a trade on April 10, 2021, that sent Brandon Montour to Florida in exchange for this pick.
 The Toronto Maple Leafs' third-round pick went to the Calgary Flames as the result of a trade on July 24, 2021, that sent Edmonton's third-round pick in 2021 (84th overall) to Los Angeles in exchange for a sixth-round pick in 2021 (168th overall) and this pick.
Los Angeles previously acquired this pick as the result of a trade on February 5, 2020, that sent Jack Campbell and Kyle Clifford to Toronto in exchange for Trevor Moore, Columbus' third-round pick in 2020 and this pick (being conditional at the time of the trade). The condition – Los Angeles will receive a third-round pick in 2021 if Clifford does not re-sign with Toronto for the 2020–21 NHL season – was converted when Clifford signed with St. Louis.
 The Pittsburgh Penguins' third-round pick went to the Edmonton Oilers as the result of a trade on July 23, 2021, that sent a first-round pick in 2021 (20th overall) to Minnesota in exchange for a first-round pick in 2021 (22nd overall) and this pick.
Minnesota previously acquired this pick as the result of a trade on October 5, 2020, that sent Ryan Donato to San Jose in exchange for this pick.
San Jose previously acquired this pick as the result of a trade on February 24, 2020, that sent Patrick Marleau to Pittsburgh in exchange for this pick (being conditional at the time of the trade). The condition – San Jose will receive a third-round pick in 2021 if Pittsburgh does not win the Stanley Cup in 2020 – was converted when the Penguins were eliminated from the 2020 Stanley Cup playoffs on August 7, 2020.
 The Carolina Hurricanes' third-round pick went to the Chicago Blackhawks as the result of a trade on July 24, 2021, that sent a third-round pick in 2022 to Carolina in exchange for this pick.
 The Vegas Golden Knights third-round pick went to the Carolina Hurricanes as the result of a trade on July 22, 2021, that sent Alex Nedeljkovic to Detroit in exchange for Jonathan Bernier and this pick.
Detroit previously acquired this pick as the result of a trade on February 26, 2018, that sent Tomas Tatar to Vegas in exchange for a first-round pick in 2018, the Islanders' second-round pick in 2019 and this pick.
 The Montreal Canadiens' third-round pick went to the Buffalo Sabres as the result of a trade on March 26, 2021, that sent Eric Staal to Montreal in exchange for a fifth-round pick in 2021 and this pick.

Round four

Notes
 The Detroit Red Wings' fourth-round pick went to the Vegas Golden Knights as the result of a trade on July 24, 2021, that sent Winnipeg's fourth-round pick and Carolina's fifth-round pick both in 2021 (114th and 155th overall) to Detroit in exchange for this pick.
 The Los Angeles Kings' fourth-round pick went to the New York Rangers as the result of a trade on March 27, 2021, that sent Brendan Lemieux to Los Angeles in exchange for this pick.
 The Vancouver Canucks' fourth-round pick went to the Chicago Blackhawks as the result of a trade on April 12, 2021, that sent Madison Bowey and a fifth-round pick in 2021 to Vancouver in exchange for this pick.
 The Ottawa Senators' fourth-round pick went to the New York Rangers as the result of a trade on October 7, 2019, that sent Vladislav Namestnikov to Ottawa in exchange for Nick Ebert and this pick.
 The Calgary Flames' fourth-round pick went to the Carolina Hurricanes as the result of a trade on July 24, 2021, that sent a second-round pick in 2021 (59th overall) to Los Angeles in exchange for a third-round pick in 2021 (72nd overall) and this pick.
Los Angeles previously acquired this pick as the result of a trade on February 24, 2020, that sent Derek Forbort to Calgary in exchange for this pick (being conditional at the time of the trade). The condition – Los Angeles will receive a fourth-round pick in 2021 if Forbort does not re-sign with Calgary for the 2020–21 NHL season – was converted when Forbort signed with the Winnipeg Jets on October 11, 2020.
 The St. Louis Blues' fourth-round pick went to the Montreal Canadiens as the result of a trade on February 18, 2020, that sent Marco Scandella to St. Louis in exchange for a second-round pick in 2020 and this pick (being conditional at the time of the trade). The condition – Montreal will receive a fourth-round pick in 2021 if Scandella re-signs with the Blues for the 2020–21 NHL season by October 7, 2020 – was converted when Scandella re-signed with the Blues on April 16, 2020.
 The Winnipeg Jets' fourth-round pick went to the Detroit Red Wings as the result of a trade on July 24, 2021, that sent a fourth-round pick in 2021 (102nd overall) to Vegas in exchange for Carolina's fifth-round pick in 2021 (155th overall) and this pick.
Vegas previously acquired this pick as the result of a trade on February 21, 2020, that sent Cody Eakin to Winnipeg in exchange for this pick (being conditional at the time of the trade). The condition – Vegas will receive a fourth-round pick in 2021 if Eakin does not re-sign with the Jets for the 2020–21 NHL season – was converted when Eakin signed with the Buffalo Sabres for the 2020–21 NHL season on October 10, 2020.
 The Toronto Maple Leafs' fourth-round pick went to the San Jose Sharks as the result of a trade on April 11, 2021, that sent Nick Foligno to Toronto in exchange for this pick.
 The Pittsburgh Penguins' fourth-round pick went to the Arizona Coyotes as the result of a trade on June 29, 2019, that sent Alex Galchenyuk and Pierre-Olivier Joseph to Pittsburgh in exchange for Phil Kessel, Dane Birks and this pick.
 The Carolina Hurricanes' fourth-round pick went to the Ottawa Senators as the result of a trade on July 24, 2021, that sent Los Angeles' fifth-round pick and a sixth-round pick both in 2021 (136th and 170th overall) to Carolina in exchange for this pick.
 The Colorado Avalanche's fourth-round pick went to the Nashville Predators as the result of a trade on October 10, 2020, that sent Austin Watson to Ottawa in exchange for this pick.
Ottawa previously acquired this pick as the result of a trade on February 24, 2020, that sent Vladislav Namestnikov to Colorado in exchange for this pick.
 The Vegas Golden Knights' fourth-round pick went to the Tampa Bay Lightning as the result of a trade on July 24, 2021, that sent a fourth-round pick in 2022 to Montreal in exchange for this pick.
Montreal previously acquired this pick as the result of a trade on February 24, 2020, that sent Nick Cousins to Vegas in exchange for this pick.
 The Montreal Canadiens' fourth-round pick went to the Minnesota Wild as the result of a trade on July 24, 2021, that sent a fifth and seventh-round pick both in 2021 (150th and 214th overall) to Montreal in exchange for this pick.
 The Tampa Bay Lightning's fourth-round pick went to the Vegas Golden Knights as the result of a trade on July 24, 2021, that sent New Jersey's second-round pick in 2021 (36th overall) to Detroit in exchange for a second-round pick in 2021 (38th overall) and this pick.
Detroit previously acquired this pick as the result of a trade on April 10, 2021, that sent David Savard to Tampa Bay in exchange for this pick.

Round five

Notes
 The Buffalo Sabres' fifth-round pick went to the New Jersey Devils as the result of a trade on February 24, 2020, that sent Wayne Simmonds to Buffalo in exchange for this pick (being conditional at the time of the trade). The condition – New Jersey will receive a fifth-round pick in 2021 if the Sabres do not qualify for the 2020 Stanley Cup playoffs – was converted on May 26, 2020, when it was announced the Sabres would not participate in the 2020 Stanley Cup playoffs.
 The New Jersey Devils' fifth-round pick went to the Columbus Blue Jackets as the result of a trade on October 8, 2020, that sent Ryan Murray to New Jersey in exchange for this pick.
 The Los Angeles Kings' fifth-round pick went to the Carolina Hurricanes as the result of a trade on July 24, 2021, that sent a fourth-round pick in 2021 (123rd overall) to Ottawa in exchange for a sixth-round pick in 2021 (170th overall) and this pick.
Ottawa previously acquired this pick as the result of a trade on July 24, 2021, that sent a second-round pick in 2021 (42nd overall) to Los Angeles in exchange for St. Louis' second-round pick in 2021 (49th overall) and this pick.
 The Ottawa Senators' fifth-round pick went to the Dallas Stars as the result of a trade on July 23, 2021, that sent a first-round pick in 2021 (15th overall) to Detroit in exchange for Washington's first-round pick and the Rangers' second-round pick both in 2021 (23rd and 48th overall) and this pick.
Detroit previously acquired this pick as the result of a trade on April 11, 2021, that sent Jon Merrill to Montreal in exchange for Hayden Verbeek and this pick.
Montreal previously acquired this pick as the result of a trade on January 2, 2020, that sent Mike Reilly to Ottawa in exchange for Andrew Sturtz and this pick.
 The Chicago Blackhawks' fifth-round pick went to the Vancouver Canucks as the result of a trade on April 12, 2021, that sent a fourth-round pick in 2021 to Chicago in exchange for Madison Bowey and this pick.
 The Philadelphia Flyers' fifth-round pick went to the Montreal Canadiens as the result of a trade on February 24, 2020, that sent Nate Thompson to Philadelphia in exchange for this pick.
 The Nashville Predators' fifth-round pick went to the Carolina Hurricanes as the result of a trade on July 24, 2021, that sent Los Angeles' third-round pick in 2021 (72nd overall) to Nashville in exchange for a third-round pick in 2021 (83rd overall) and this pick.
 The Edmonton Oilers' fifth-round pick went to the Anaheim Ducks as the result of a trade on October 8, 2020, that sent Erik Gudbranson to Ottawa in exchange for this pick.
Ottawa previously acquired this pick as the result of a trade on February 24, 2020, that sent Tyler Ennis to Edmonton in exchange for this pick.
 The Minnesota Wild's fifth-round pick went to the Montreal Canadiens as the result of a trade on July 24, 2021, that sent a fourth-round pick in 2021 (127th overall) to Minnesota in exchange for a seventh-round pick in 2021 (214th overall) and this pick.
 The Carolina Hurricanes' fifth-round pick went to the Detroit Red Wings as the result of a trade on July 24, 2021, that sent a fourth-round pick in 2021 (102nd overall) to Vegas in exchange for Winnipeg's fourth-round pick in 2021 (114th overall) and this pick.
Vegas previously acquired this pick as the result of a trade on June 26, 2019, that sent Erik Haula to Carolina in exchange for Nicolas Roy and this pick (being conditional at the time of the trade). The condition – Vegas will receive a fifth-round pick in 2021 if Carolina trades Haula for a player, multiple draft picks or if he is traded for a draft pick in the first five rounds of any future draft – was converted when Haula was traded to the Florida Panthers on February 24, 2020.
 The Colorado Avalanche's fifth-round pick went to the San Jose Sharks as the result of a trade on April 10, 2021, that sent Devan Dubnyk to Colorado in exchange for Greg Pateryn and this pick.
 The Vegas Golden Knights' fifth-round pick went to the Philadelphia Flyers as the result of a trade on April 12, 2021, that sent Michael Raffl to Washington in exchange for this pick.
Washington previously acquired this as the result of a trade on December 2, 2019, that sent Chandler Stephenson to Vegas in exchange for this pick.
 The Montreal Canadiens' fifth-round pick went to the Buffalo Sabres as the result of a trade on March 26, 2021, that sent Eric Staal to Montreal in exchange for a third-round pick in 2021 and this pick.

Round six

Notes
 The Los Angeles Kings' sixth-round pick went to the Calgary Flames as the result of a trade on July 24, 2021, that sent Edmonton's third-round pick in 2021 (84th overall) to Los Angeles in exchange for Toronto's third-round pick in 2021 (89th overall) and this pick.
 The Ottawa Senators' sixth-round pick went to the Carolina Hurricanes as the result of a trade on July 24, 2021, that sent a fourth-round pick in 2021 (123rd overall) to Ottawa in exchange for Los Angeles' fifth-round pick in 2021 (136th overall) and this pick.
 The New York Rangers' sith-round pick went to the Washington Capitals as the result of a trade on July 24, 2021, that sent Arizona's third-round pick in 2021 (75th overall) to New York in exchange for a third-round pick in 2021 (80th overall) and this pick.
 The St. Louis Blues' sixth-round pick went to the San Jose Sharks as the result of a trade on July 24, 2021, that sent a third-round pick in 2021 (71st overall) to St. Louis in exchange for a third-round pick in 2021 (81st overall) and this pick.
 The Winnipeg Jets' sixth-round pick went to the Vancouver Canucks as the result of a trade on April 12, 2021, that sent Jordie Benn to Winnipeg in exchange for this pick.
 The Pittsburgh Penguins' sixth-round pick went to the Edmonton Oilers as the result of a trade on July 26, 2019, that sent John Marino to Pittsburgh in exchange for this pick (being conditional at the time of the trade). The condition – Edmonton will receive a sixth-round pick in 2021 if Marino signs with the Penguins – was converted when Marino signed with the Penguins on August 8, 2019.
 The Colorado Avalanche's sixth-round pick went to the Buffalo Sabres as the result of a trade on March 20, 2021, that sent Jonas Johansson to Colorado in exchange for this pick.

Round seven

Notes
 The Anaheim Ducks' seventh-round pick went to the Pittsburgh Penguins as the result of a trade on October 25, 2019, that sent Erik Gudbranson to Anaheim in exchange for Andreas Martinsen and this pick.
 The New Jersey Devils' seventh-round pick went to the Tampa Bay Lightning as the result of a trade on November 1, 2019, that sent Louis Domingue to New Jersey in exchange for this pick (being conditional at the time of the trade). The condition – Tampa Bay will receive a seventh-round pick in 2021 if Domingue plays in seven games for the Devils during the 2019–20 NHL season – was converted on January 9, 2020.
 The Detroit Red Wings' seventh-round pick went to the St. Louis Blues as the result of a trade on October 7, 2020, that sent Chicago's seventh-round pick in 2020 (203rd overall) to Detroit in exchange for this pick.
 The Los Angeles Kings' seventh-round pick went to the Carolina Hurricanes as the result of a trade on October 7, 2020, that sent Montreal's fifth-round pick in 2020 (140th overall) to Los Angeles in exchange for a sixth-round pick in 2020 and this pick.
 The Arizona Coyotes' seventh-round pick went to the New Jersey Devils as the result of a trade on October 7, 2020, that sent a seventh-round pick in 2020 (192nd overall) to Arizona in exchange for this pick.
 The St. Louis Blues' seventh-round pick went to the Carolina Hurricanes as the result of a trade on September 24, 2019, that sent Justin Faulk and a fifth-round pick in 2020 to St. Louis in exchange for Joel Edmundson, Dominik Bokk and this pick.
 The Winnipeg Jets' seventh-round pick went to the Florida Panthers as the result of a trade on February 25, 2019, that sent Bogdan Kiselevich to Winnipeg in exchange for this pick.
 The Nashville Predators' seventh-round pick went to the Tampa Bay Lightning as the result of a trade on June 14, 2019, that sent Connor Ingram to Nashville in exchange for this pick.
 The Minnesota Wild's seventh-round pick went to the Montreal Canadiens as the result of a trade on July 24, 2021, that sent a fourth-round pick in 2021 (127th overall) to Minnesota in exchange for a fifth-round pick in 2021 (150th overall) and this pick.
 The Washington Capitals' seventh-round pick went to the Pittsburgh Penguins as the result of a trade on October 7, 2020, that sent Colorado's seventh-round pick in 2020 (211th overall) to Washington in exchange for this pick.
 The Florida Panthers' seventh-round pick went to the Chicago Blackhawks as the result of a trade on April 8, 2021, that sent Lucas Carlsson and Lucas Wallmark to Florida in exchange for Brett Connolly, Riley Stillman, Henrik Borgstrom and this pick.
 The Toronto Maple Leafs' seventh-round pick went to the Boston Bruins as the result of a trade on October 7, 2020, that sent a seventh-round pick in 2020 (213th overall) to Toronto in exchange for this pick.
 The Montreal Canadiens' seventh-round pick went Arizona Coyotes as the result of a trade on July 24, 2021, that sent St. Louis' seventh-round pick in 2022 to Montreal in exchange for this pick.
Montreal previously re-acquired this pick as the result of a trade on October 7, 2020, that sent Ottawa's seventh-round pick in 2020 to Chicago in exchange for this pick.
Chicago previously acquired this pick as the result of a trade on June 30, 2019, that sent second and seventh-round picks both in 2020 and a third-round pick in 2021 to Montreal in exchange for Andrew Shaw and this pick.

Draftees based on nationality

North American draftees by state/province

Broadcasting
In Canada, coverage of the draft would be televised on Sportsnet.

In the United States, for the first time since the 2003 Draft, coverage of the draft would televised on ESPN2.

See also
 2017–18 NHL transactions
 2018–19 NHL transactions
 2019–20 NHL transactions
 2020–21 NHL transactions
 2021–22 NHL transactions
 2021–22 NHL season
 2021 NHL Expansion Draft
 List of first overall NHL draft picks
 List of NHL players

References

External links
2021 NHL Entry Draft player stats at The Internet Hockey Database

Entry Draft
NHL Entry Draft
NHL Entry Draft
Events in New Jersey
Ice hockey in New Jersey
NHL
National Hockey League in the New York metropolitan area
National Hockey League Entry Draft